The Black Monocle (French: Le monocle noir) is a 1961 French comedy crime film directed by Georges Lautner and starring Paul Meurisse, Elga Andersen and Bernard Blier. It was followed by two sequels The Eye of the Monocle (1962) and The Monocle Laughs (1964).

Cast
 Paul Meurisse as Le commandant Théobald Dromard dit 'Le Monocle'  
 Elga Andersen as Martha  
 Bernard Blier as Commissaire Tournmire  
 Pierre Blanchar as le marquis de Villemaur  
 Jacques Marin as Trochu  
 Jacques Dufilho as Charvet, le guide  
 Albert Rémy as Mérignac - le bibliothécaire  
 Nico Pepe as Brozzi  
 Raymond Meunier as Raymond  
 Raoul Saint-Yves as Jean  
 Catherine Sola as Monique  
 Marie Dubois as Bénédicte de Villemaur  
 Gérard Buhr as Heinrich  
 Lutz Gabor as Mathias 
 Alain Bouvette as Un inspecteur  
 Jean Sylvère as Un inspecteur

References

Bibliography 
 Rège, Philippe. Encyclopedia of French Film Directors, Volume 1. Scarecrow Press, 2009.

External links 
 

1961 films
French crime comedy films
1960s crime comedy films
1960s French-language films
Films directed by Georges Lautner
Pathé films
1961 comedy films
1960s French films